Formylhydrazine is a chemical compound with the molecular formula CH4N2O and it has a mass of 60 g/mol. It is also known as formic acid hydrazide, hydrazinecarboxaldehyde, formohydrazide, or formic hydrazide. It is the simplest to call it hydrazide. Formylhydrazine can act as a bidentate ligand with cobalt, zinc, or cadmium.

Formation
Formylhydrazine can be produced by the acid hydrolysis of diazomethane. H2CN2 + H2O → HC(O)NHNH2.

Properties
Formylhydrazine causes lung cancer in mice.

References

Hydrazides